Baltic Tribes: Last Pagans of Europe is a 2018 Latvian popular science documentary film co-directed by Lauris Ābele and Raitis Ābele about the Baltic people in the 13th century. The film consists of historical reconstructions, live action scenes and computer animations supplemented with a voice-over narration by scientific experts of the field.

In 2016 the film received financing from the National Film Centre's special fund for the 100th Anniversary of the Latvian Republic. In 2018 Baltic Tribes were nominated for a Lielais Kristaps National Film Festival award in the category "Best Documentary". On October 21, 2018 Baltic tribes premiered in the U.S. at the Baltic Film festival taking place at the Scandinavian House.

Plot  
Lars, a merchant from Gotland, travels through the lands of Curonians, Latgalians, Selonians, Semigallians, Prussians, Yatvingians, Galindians, Aukštaitians and Samogitians.

Awards and nominations

References

External links 

Official trailer (English). Film Threat. via YouTube. December 26, 2019
Movie page at UCM.ONE (English). December 3, 2021
Kaspars Bārbals (December 19, 2018). Baltic Tribes Soundtrack. BandCamp.

2018 films
Latvian documentary films
Films set in the 13th century
Northern Crusades films